The Frontier Wire was a  obstacle in Italian Libya, along the length of the border of British-held Egypt, running from El Ramleh, in the Gulf of Sollum (between Bardia and Sollum) south to Jaghbub parallel to the 25th meridian east, the Libya–Egypt and Libya–Sudan borders. The frontier wire and its line of covering forts was built by the Italians during the Second Italo-Senussi War (1923–1931), as a defensive system to contain the Senussi population, who crossed from Egypt during their resistance against Italian colonisers.

From the Italian declaration of war on 10 June 1940 until the conquest of Libya by the British in 1942, it was the scene of military engagements between Italian, British and German forces as the fighting ebbed and flowed across the frontier. While the installation was reasonably effective against the poorly equipped Senussi, it was ineffective against the well-equipped conventional army fielded by the British.

Background
Three large forts at Amseat (Fort Capuzzo), Scegga (Fort Maddalena) and Giarabub and six smaller ones at El Ramleh on the Gulf of Sollum, Sidi Omar, Sceferzen, Vescechet, Garn ul Grein, and El Aamara were built along the wire. The wire was patrolled using aircraft and armoured cars from the forts, by the Italian army and border guards, who attacked anyone seen in the frontier zone.

Prelude

Frontier skirmishes

Some Italian troops were unaware that war had been declared and seventy were captured during the day, on the track to Sidi Omar. Italian reinforcements then arrived at the frontier, began to reconnoitre, improved the frontier defences and recaptured Fort Capuzzo.

Fort Capuzzo

Fort Capuzzo was one of the forts built near the border with Egypt and the frontier wire, part of a system of frontier control built in the early 1930s. The fort was built with four crenellated stone walls around a yard with living quarters on the edges. A track ran south from the fort, just west of the frontier wire and the border, to Sidi Omar, Fort Maddalena and Giarabub. On 14 June, after the Italian declaration of war on Britain four days earlier, the 7th Hussars and elements of the 1st Royal Tank Regiment, supported by Gloster Gladiator fighters of 33 Squadron Royal Air Force (RAF) and Bristol Blenheim bombers of 211 Squadron captured Fort Capuzzo as the 11th Hussars took Fort Maddalena, about  further south.

The fort was not occupied long, for lack of troops and equipment, but demolition parties visited each night to destroy Italian ammunition and vehicles. The Italians reoccupied Fort Capuzzo and held it with part of the 2nd Blackshirt Division (28 October) ( Francesco Argentino). On 29 June, the Maletti Group repulsed British tanks with its artillery and then defeated a night attack. During the frontier skirmishes from  the British claimed to have inflicted  for a loss of  On 16 December, during Operation Compass  the 4th Armoured Brigade of the Western Desert Force captured Sidi Omar and the Italians withdrew from Sollum, Fort Capuzzo and the other frontier forts. Number  Supply Depot was established at the fort for the 7th Armoured Division.

Sidi Omar

The fortified camp at Sidi Omar was ringed with barbed wire, trenches and minefields. On 11 June 1940, the 11th Hussars in Rolls-Royce and Morris CS9 armoured cars closed up to the frontier wire, crossed during the night and exchanged fire with the garrison at Sidi Omar. Sidi Omar was captured on 16 December, during Operation Compass by the 7th Hussars, 2nd Royal Tank Regiment (2nd RTR) and the 4th Royal Horse Artillery (4th RHA). The British bombarded the fort, then tanks charged the fort and one broke through the wall. After a second tank drove through the hole in the wall, the garrison began to surrender. The Italians had concentrated their firepower on the east wall facing Egypt and had been surprised by an attack from the west. The fall of the fort left the way clear for the British to send reinforcements and supplies to the forces further north on the coast, free from the possibility of attack from the inland flank.

Nezuet Ghirba
On 16 June 1940, two days after the loss of Fort Capuzzo and Fort Maddalena and six days after the Italian declaration of war, the 10th Army formed  (Colonel Lorenzo D’Avanzo) with orders to end British penetrations of the frontier wire near Fort Capuzzo. As  advanced toward Fort Capuzzo in two columns, British forces in the vicinity were ordered to withdraw across the border.

D’Avanzo, formed a defensive square, with the four guns at the corners, the infantry along the sides and the twelve L3 light tanks patrolling outside. The British reinforced the 11th Hussars with the 7th Hussars armoured cars and a mixed force of light tanks, a cruiser squadron of Cruiser Mk I tanks and an artillery battery. The Italian tanks charged forward ahead of the artillery and infantry and were knocked out. The British then circled the Italian square, firing at the lorries and infantry; after the second circuit, the Italian artillery opened fire. The Italian gunners had only high explosive ammunition and the British concentrated on the guns at each corner. Lacking cover the Italian gunners were soon shot down and then the infantry broke. The British destroyed twelve light tanks, the four guns and killed or captured  the  infantry.

Fort Maddalena

A Squadron of the 11th Hussars made three gaps in the wire on the night of 11 June, cut telephone poles on the Italian side and skirmished around the fort. On 13 June, an armoured car troop attacked the fort and was repulsed by the garrison, then attacked by Italian aircraft as they retreated.

Siege of Giarabub

The Siege of Giarabub (now Jaghbub) in Libya, took place between the WDF and the Italian garrison.

Air transport proved insufficient and hunger prompted many of the locally recruited troops to desert. After being reinforced by the 2/9th Australian Battalion and a battery of the 4th RHA, the Australians attacked and captured Giarabub from  The Australians left behind a salvage party and withdrew from the oasis the next day, just before the Italo-German counter-offensive, Operation Sonnenblume,  which recaptured Cyrenaica.

Post war

After the Allied conquest in 1943, Tripolitania and Cyrenaica were ruled under the British Military Administration of Libya until independence in 1951, as a kingdom under Muhammad Idris bin Muhammad al-Mahdi as-Senussi (King Idris of Libya) and the frontier wire disappeared into obscurity.

Orders of battle

Frontier wire fort garrisons, June 1940

Details taken from Christie (1999) unless specified.
 Commander in Chief  (Italian North Africa)  (Marshal) Italo Balbo
 Giarabub
 Infantry company
 Auto-MG company
 3rd Libyan Fortress Machine Gun Battalion
 Four companies fixed MGs
 Reinforced AT Platoon (6 × 47/32 M35 anti-tank guns
 Reinforced AA Platoon (6 × 20 mm Breda Model 35 AA guns)
 Infantry Gun Platoon (2 × 65/17 modello 13 guns)
 Bir Scegga (Fort Maddalena)
 Infantry company
 MG Company
 AT Platoon (4 × 47/32 AT guns)
 AA Platoon (4 ×  AA guns)
 El Garn ul Grein
 Infantry company
 MG platoon
 AT Platoon (4 × 47/32 M35 AT guns)
 AA Platoon (4 ×  AA guns)
 Gialo (Oasis Garrison)
 MG Battalion
 Libyan Replacement Battalion
 AT Company (12 × 47/32 AT guns)
 AA Platoon (4 ×  AA guns)
 Saharan Company

Western Desert Force, June 1940

Commander-in-Chief Middle East, General Sir Archibald Wavell
 Western Desert Force (commander, Lieutenant General R. N. O’Connor)
 7th Armoured Division (commander, Major-General M. O’Moore)
 4th Armoured Brigade, Mersa Matruh
 1st Royal Tank Regiment
 6th Royal Tank Regiment
 7th Armoured Brigade, Sidi Sulieman
 7th Hussars
 8th Hussars
 Support Group. (Motorized Infantry Brigade) Sidi Barrani
 1st King's Royal Rifle Corps Battalion
 2nd Motor Battalion The Rifle Brigade
 3rd Battalion Coldstream Guards
 1st Royal Northumberland Fusiliers
 3rd Regiment Royal Horse Artillery
 F Battery, 4th Royal Horse Artillery
 11th Hussars (attached to Support Group from 7th Armoured Brigade) Forward at Sidi Barrani with operations on the Libyan-Egyptian Border
 Cairo Infantry Brigade Garrison for Mersa Matruh

Other Commonwealth Forces in Egypt
 4th Indian Division (less one infantry brigade) Nile Delta
 5th Indian Infantry Brigade
 11th Indian Infantry Brigade
 Divisional Troops
 6th Australian Division (forming, Nile delta)
 2nd New Zealand Division (forming, Nile delta)

See also

 Fort Capuzzo
 Italian Libya
 History of Libya as Italian Colony

Notes

Footnotes

References

Books
 
 
 
 
 
 
 
 

Theses
 

Websites

Further reading

External links 
 British Official History: The Mediterranean and Middle East Vol I, Ch 6: Italy Declares War
 "Peace in Libya". Time. 8 February 1932.
 The wire at Fort Maddalena
 Photomontage of the frontier wire at Jaghbub, 2009
 Colonial Soldiers in Italian Counter-Insurgency Operations in Libya, 1922–32
 Battle of Ghirba (in Italian)

Italian Libya
Fortifications in Libya
World War II defensive lines
Historic defensive lines
Italian fascist architecture
Fortification (obstacles)
World War II sites in Libya
World War II sites of Fascist Italy
Italy–Libya relations